Marius Mitu (born 10 September 1976) is a retired Romanian midfielder who last played for plays for CSM Râmnicu Vâlcea.

Mitu has played for R.S.C. Anderlecht until February 2006 and has appeared at Lierse SK previously.  Mitu also played for R.W.D. Molenbeek (one year) and R.A.A. Louviéroise (six months) in Belgium.  Prior to his move to Belgium in 2001, he played for several Romanian clubs such as Steaua București and FC Universitatea Craiova.

In February 2006, Mitu was expelled from Anderlecht, because of his possible connection with a match-fixing scandal when he played for Lierse SK in 2005.

References

External links

Marius Mitu stats 

1976 births
Living people
Footballers from Bucharest
Romanian footballers
Association football midfielders
Romanian expatriate footballers
Liga I players
FCV Farul Constanța players
FC U Craiova 1948 players
FC Steaua București players
R.W.D. Molenbeek players
R.A.A. Louviéroise players
Lierse S.K. players
R.S.C. Anderlecht players
Belgian Pro League players
FC Metalurh Donetsk players
Ukrainian Premier League players
Xanthi F.C. players
FC Progresul București players
Panthrakikos F.C. players
SCM Râmnicu Vâlcea players
Super League Greece players
Expatriate footballers in Belgium
Expatriate footballers in Greece
Expatriate footballers in Ukraine
Romanian expatriate sportspeople in Ukraine
FCM Târgoviște players
AFC Rocar București players